= Vishal Arya =

1. REDIRECT Draft:Vishal Arya
